Leonardo Valdés Zurita is a Mexican scholar who currently served as president of the National Electoral Institute (previously Federal Electoral Institute). He grew up in Mexico City.

References
 Ricardo Gomez, Andrea Merloz "Aprueban a Leonardo Valdés Zurita al frente del IFE" Mexico City:El Universal 7 Feb 2008
 Francisco Reséndiz "Amaga titular del IFE con entregar renuncia" El Universal 20 April 2008

Mexican academics
Living people
Year of birth missing (living people)